The women's 1000 meter at the 2017 KNSB Dutch Single Distance Championships took place in Heerenveen at the Thialf ice skating rink on Sunday 30 December 2016. Though this tournament was held in 2016, it was part of the speed skating season 2016–2017. 
There were 20 participants.

Title holder was Jorien ter Mors.

Result

  DNF = Did not finish

Source:

References 

Single Distance Championships
2017 Single Distance
World